Metius flavipes is a species of ground beetle in the subfamily Pterostichinae. It was described by Dejean in 1828.

References

Metius (genus)
Beetles described in 1828